Brygida Dziuba (born 11 February 1939) is a former Polish gymnast. She competed at the 1960 Summer Olympics representing Poland.

See also 
 Poland at the 1960 Summer Olympics

References 

1939 births
Living people
Olympic gymnasts of Poland
Gymnasts at the 1960 Summer Olympics
Polish female artistic gymnasts
Sportspeople from Ruda Śląska
20th-century Polish women